Chiasmia defixaria is a moth of the  family Geometridae. It is found in Asia, including Japan, Korea and Taiwan.

The wingspan is 25–27 mm.

References

Macariini
Moths of Japan